is a Japanese video game writer born in 1975 best known for his work with Team Silent in the Silent Hill franchise.

Career
Ōwaku first worked on the survival horror video game Silent Hill (1999) as event programmer and enemy programmer. Following the game's success, Team Silent worked on various sequels, direct or indirect, and Ōwaku worked consistently as scenario writer. He was drama programmer for Silent Hill 2 and is credited as scenario writer for the game. He also wrote the scenario for Silent Hill 3 (2003), direct sequel to the first game.

Team Silent disbanded following the release of Silent Hill 4: The Room (2004). Director Suguru Murakoshi took over writing the game, and Ōwaku is credited with a Special Thanks, as well as for writing the original lyrics Tender Sugar, Cradle of Forest, Your Rain, Room of Angel and Waiting For You, the last of which was featured in Karaoke Revolution Volume 3 (2004) and for which he is also credited.

The series has since been taken over by external developers. Ōwaku and fellow Team Silent art designer Masahiro Ito went on to work together on Silent Hill: Cage of Cradle (2006), a digital manga published by Konami, downloadable for cell-phones and only available in Japan.  This was followed by Silent Hill: Double under Dusk (2007).  Ōwaku was also credited with another Special Thanks in Silent Hill: Origins (2007). This makes Ōwaku the longest-standing contributor to the Silent Hill series, behind composer Akira Yamaoka, who scored every game except for Silent Hill: Downpour.

References

Living people
Japanese lyricists
Japanese video game programmers
Silent Hill
Year of birth missing (living people)
Video game writers